Timo Becker (born 2 July 1989) is a German footballer who plays as a midfielder for Spvgg 05 Oberrad.

References

External links
 
 Timo Becker on FuPa.net

1989 births
Living people
People from Kirchheimbolanden
German footballers
Association football defenders
FV Biebrich players
SV Darmstadt 98 players
SV Wehen Wiesbaden players
3. Liga players
Regionalliga players
Footballers from Rhineland-Palatinate